The 2007 Meteor Music Awards ceremony was held in the Point Theatre, Dublin on Thursday, 1 February 2007. It was the seventh edition of Ireland's national music awards and the last to be held at the Point before it shut for redevelopment. The event was presented by television personalities Podge and Rodge and comedian Deirdre O'Kane, who donned a showgirl outfit to open the awards ceremony. It was later broadcast on RTÉ Two on Sunday, 4 February at 21:00.

Performances 
There were performances on the night from Westlife with Ronan Keating, "The Dance", Kaiser Chiefs (who were first on stage),  Director, The Pussycat Dolls, Amy Winehouse, The Feeling, The Blizzards and The Immediate.

Winners

References

External links
 Official site
 MCD Promotions
 List of winners through the years

Meteor Music Awards
Meteor Awards